Podgorensky District  is an administrative and municipal district (raion), one of the thirty-two in Voronezh Oblast, Russia. It is located in the southwestern central part of the oblast. Its administrative center is the urban locality (an urban-type settlement) of Podgorensky. Population:  The population of the administrative center accounts for 24.8% of the district's total population.

References

Notes

Sources

Districts of Voronezh Oblast